Nomegestrol acetate/estradiol (NOMAC-E2), sold under the brand names Naemis and Zoely among others, is a fixed-dose combination medication of nomegestrol acetate, a progestogen, and estradiol, an estrogen, which is used in menopausal hormone therapy and as a birth control pill to prevent pregnancy in women. It is taken by mouth.

Research 
Estradiol-containing birth control pills like NOMAC-E2 may have a lower risk of venous thromboembolism than birth control pills containing ethinylestradiol. This is being studied in the case of NOMAC-E2.

See also 
 List of combined sex-hormonal preparations

References

External links 
 

Combined estrogen–progestogen formulations